The discography of the Irish pop rock quartet Director, from their debut single "Reconnect" to their most recent single "Sing It Without a Tune".

Albums

Studio albums
 We Thrive on Big Cities (October 6, 2006)
 I'll Wait for Sound (May 8, 2009)

Live albums
 Even Better Than the Disco Thing (21 November 2008, 1 track contribution)

Singles
 Reconnect (April 24, 2006)
 Come With a Friend (September 29, 2006)
 Leave It to Me (January 5, 2007)
 Be With You (May 11, 2007)

Chart positions

Albums

Singles

References

Discographies of Irish artists
Pop music group discographies